Michael Ernest Sorvino (born November 21, 1977) is an American actor and producer. He is best known as the voice of Tommy Angelo, the protagonist in Mafia. His other acting roles include parts in Summer of Sam, The Trouble with Cali, and Once Upon a Time in Queens. He is the son of actor Paul Sorvino (1939–2022) and Lorraine Ruth Davis and the brother of actress Mira Sorvino.

Career
Sorvino was born in Tenafly, New Jersey to actor Paul Sorvino and graduated from Tenafly High School in 1996. He went on to graduate from Rutgers University's Mason Gross School of the Arts in New Brunswick, New Jersey with a Bachelor's Degree in Theater in May 2001. Sorvino first started acting in 1993 with a part in the film Amongst Friends. He had a recurring role in 2005 on the television series Human Trafficking. He also voiced the lead character Tommy Angelo in the game Mafia.

Sorvino also produced the 2016 comedy-drama film Almost Paris, which was directed by Domenica Cameron-Scorsese.

Filmography

Film

Television

Video games

References

External links

1977 births
American male film actors
American male video game actors
American male voice actors
American people of Italian descent
Film producers from New Jersey
Living people
Male actors from New Jersey
Mason Gross School of the Arts alumni
People from Tenafly, New Jersey
Tenafly High School alumni